In Christianity, concelebration (from Lat., con + celebrare, to celebrate together) is the presiding of a number of presbyters (priests or ministers) at the celebration of the Eucharist with either a presbyter or bishop as the principal celebrant and the other presbyters and bishops present in the chancel assisting in the consecration of the Eucharist. The concelebrants assist the principal celebrant by reciting the Words of Consecration together with him, thus effecting the change of the eucharistic elements. They may also recite portions of the Eucharistic Prayer. Concelebration is often practiced by ministers of Churches that are in full communion with one another, e.g. the Anglican Communion and the Old Catholic Church.

History
Concelebration is and has always been common in Eastern Christianity, but in the Roman Catholic Church the practice fell into disuse for several centuries but has been revived with the liturgical reforms of the Second Vatican Council as dictated in the document Sacrosanctum Concilium. Theologians Orlando O. Espín and James B. Nickoloff write that "Eucharastic concelebration has ancient roots (Hippolytus, Apostolic Tradition, early third century) and was practiced primarily as a sign of ecclesial unity of the local church and of union with other churches when eucharistic hospitality was offered to visiting bishops or presbyters."

Practice

Roman Catholic Church

It is known from early Christian art uncovered through archaeology that concelebration took place in the Early Church in the West, although it is not known precisely when it fell into disuse. It is known that the practice gradually came to be reserved for the greater festival days and other solemn occasions. Columba of Iona, in the 6th century, is recorded to have been requested by a visiting Irish bishop in disguise to celebrate Mass with him. The 619 council of Seville ordered that priests could not concelebrate Mass with a bishop present. According to Pope Innocent III (r.1198-1216) the cardinals in Rome still concelebrated with the pope on certain feast days. It is known that from the medieval period (particularly following the Black Death) up to the Second Vatican Council there were only two occasions when concelebration took place in the Roman Rite:

 At the ordination of a priest, where the newly ordained concelebrated with the ordaining bishop, and
 At the consecration of a bishop, when the newly consecrated bishop concelebrated with the consecrating bishop.

The liturgical reforms following the Second Vatican Council provided for the return to the practice of concelebration of Mass. An example of studies in the immediate post-conciliar years regarding the matter of this liturgical practice is the volume of essays by a distinguished group of Roman Catholic churchmen (Burkhard Neunheuser et al.) titled Théologie et pratique de la Concélébration (Maison Mame, 1967, translated from the Italian original, La Concelebrazione, which Edizioni Queriniana had published). Thus, communities with more than one priest could have several priests concelebrate the Eucharist rather than each celebrating it in private, emphasizing its communal nature. Liturgical law allows concelebration on any occasion, but it is more common on feasts, especially those at which the bishop traditionally presides, such as the Chrism Mass on Maundy Thursday.

An article in La Civiltà Cattolica of 2 October 2004 pointed out that the reintroduction of Eucharistic concelebration in the Latin Church was in line with the teaching of Pope Pius XII, who taught that the two "assistant bishops" at the consecration of a new bishop should speak all the words of consecration, thus indicating clearly that, instead of being merely witnesses, they were co-consecrating, concelebrating the sacrament of orders. He applied the same rule to concelebration of the Eucharist (at that time in use only at ordination to episcopacy and to priesthood) in his talk of 22 September 1956.

Anglican Communion
Traditionally, concelebration was not practiced or permitted in Anglican churches. However, the Book of Common Prayer of the Episcopal Church directs other clergy to "stand with the celebrant at the Altar, and join in the consecration of the gifts, in breaking the Bread, and in distributing Communion."

References

Catholic liturgy